John William Barton (18 January 1895 – 1962) was an English footballer who played for Blackburn Rovers and Rochdale.

References

Rochdale A.F.C. players
Burnley F.C. players
Blackburn Rovers F.C. players
Merthyr Town F.C. players
Colwyn Bay F.C. players
Chester City F.C. players
Manchester North End F.C. players
Ashton National F.C. players
New Mills A.F.C. players
English footballers
Footballers from Southport
1895 births
1959 deaths
Association football fullbacks